Hudson Catholic High School may refer to:
 Hudson Catholic High School, now Hudson Catholic Regional High School (New Jersey)
 Hudson Catholic High School (Hudson, Massachusetts)